Chepén may refer to

 Chepén, a town in Peru
 Chepén District, a district in Peru
 Chepén Province, a province in Peru